Larry May is the name of:

Larry May (footballer) (born 1958), English footballer
Larry May (philosopher), American philosopher